"Gone To Stay" is a single by Natalia. It is the lead single of her third studio album, Everything and More. It was released in Belgium 19 May 2007. The song is recorded in Berlin, together with the other tracks of the album.

Charts

Music video
There was no music video for Gone To Stay.  Natalia's manager Bob Savenberg: "It is summer, so there aren't many people that watch television.  There will be a video of the next single, which will be released internationally as well."

Awards
Natalia received the award for Best Song Of The Summer from radiostation "Radio 2".  It's the first time she wins the award and she wins from Belle Perez, who won the award for 5 years.

The song was also nominated for Best Song Of The Summer on Tien Om Te Zien on the TV channel VTM.  But she didn't win.

Lyrics
The song handles a couple that is breaking up after a lot of troubles. But Natalia sings she'll be just fine without him.  "I don't care and I don't mind, if you gonna find somebody else, boy that's alright".

References 

2007 singles
Natalia (Belgian singer) songs
Songs written by Herbie Crichlow
2007 songs
Sony BMG singles